Christian Inngjerdingen (born 19 December 1996) is a Swedish ski jumper.

He represented Sweden at the FIS Nordic World Ski Championships 2015 in Falun.

References

External links 
 

1996 births
Living people
Swedish male ski jumpers